Maria Farhad (born 2001) is a beauty pageant titleholder who was named Miss Iraq 2021. She represented Iraq at the Miss World 2021 pageant in Puerto Rico in 2022.

Early life
Farhad was born to an Assyrian family in Qaraqosh, located in the Nineveh Governorate, northern Iraq. Farhad is studying computer science at the University of Mosul. Farhad relocated to Erbil in the wake of the Islamic State attacks in 2014.

Pageantry 
Farhad was named Miss Iraq 2021 at a pageant held in Erbil and sponsored by the Iraqi Culture Ministry and broadcast on Al Rasheed TV.

Although the Miss Iraq organization held a contest to send its representative to Miss Universe, it participated in Miss World 2021 instead since the Miss Universe 2021 contest venue was Israel.

See also 
Iraqi beauty pageants

References

2001 births
Living people
Iraqi Eastern Catholics
Iraqi Christians
Middle Eastern Christians

ar:ماريا فرهاد